The Oreca 01 is a Le Mans Prototype built by Oreca Racing in 2009. It is to replace the Courage-Oreca LC70 raced previously by Oreca. It is powered by an engine from Japanese engine company AIM Power. It is a tuned Judd engine that develops 650 bhp 485 kW, all of which is available at 8000 rpm.

Racing

2009
Team Oreca Matmut-AIM debuted two Oreca 01's at the 2009 1000 km of Spa, the second round of the 2009 Le Mans Series season. It started off well with the #10 car qualifying fourth place. Unfortunately, Bruno Senna, driving the #10 car had a huge crash after completing 129 of the race winners 143 laps. The accident damage looked identical to the other #10 driver Stéphane Ortelli's crash at the 2008 1000 km of Monza which put him out of the running for the 2008 24 Hours of Le Mans. Luckily, the #11 car did finish, in fourth place getting five points.

At the 2009 24 Hours of Le Mans, the #11 car finished 5th. The #10 did not finish, dropping out after 219 laps.

2010

A single Oreca 01 was entered in the 2010 24 Hours of Le Mans alongside a Peugeot 908 HDi FAP, qualifying with a time of 3:29.506, putting it in 10th place. Despite the Lola-Aston Martins being favoured to win the "petrol" P1 class all 3 of them as well as all 4 Peugeots suffered reliability issues, the Oreca 01 was able to take an impressive 4th place overall, highest petrol-fuel finisher and behind only the 3 factory Audis.

2011
2011 saw the Oreca 01 raced by Swiss team Hope Racing as a hybrid-powered vehicle at Le Mans, using the KERS system featured in Formula One and powered by a Volkswagen-based 2 litre engine. The engine is significantly smaller than the AIM (Judd) V10 engine used before in the 01 as there were changes made to the regulations for the 2011 season.  The Oreca 01 did not finish, retiring after 115 laps.

External links

  Technical Specs

Le Mans Prototypes
24 Hours of Le Mans race cars
Sports prototypes